Seoirse Brún (George Browne), was an Irish scribe, fl. 1876. Brún, a native of Creggduff, Annaghdown, County Galway, is known only from a manuscript called RBÉ F006. It contains the following note:

George Browne Cregg Duff This Book/Belongs to him For Certain No Other Person/in This Locality can claim on This/Book but him Alone When he is Dead/and his bones are rotten This Little Book/Will tell his Name when he is quite/Forgotten Given under My ha[n]d this 18th Day of Oct 1876 - George Browne/Cregg Duff Annadown/County of Galway Ireland, The European Iliad.

The Annaghdown-Headford has Irish speakers as of 2009. He may have been descended from one of The Tribes of Galway, the family Browne.

See also
Sir Dominick Browne, M.P., ca. 1585?-ca. 1656.
Mary Bonaventure Browne, Poor Clare and historian, born after 1610, died after 1670.
Geoffrey Browne, M.P., died 1668.
Dominick Browne, Mayor of Galway, 1688-1689.
Michael Browne (1895–1980), Bishop of Galway and Kilmacduagh from 1937 to 1976.
Dominick Browne, 1st Baron Oranmore and Browne (1787–1860), politician.
Séamus de Brún (1911–2003), teacher and senator
Ken Bruen (born 1951), noir crime writer.

References
Scríobhaithe Lámhscríbhinní Gaeilge I nGaillimh 1700-1900, William Mahon, in "Galway:History and Society", 1996
The Tribes of Galway, Adrian James Martyn, Galway, 2001

People from County Galway
19th-century Irish people
Irish-language writers
Irish scribes